Periakrishnapuram is a village in the Udayarpalayam taluk of Ariyalur district, Tamil Nadu, India.

Demographics 

As per the 2001 census, Periakrishnapuram had a total population of 5053 with 2538 males and 2515 females.

References 

Villages in Ariyalur district